The Touo language, also known as Baniata (Mbaniata) or Lokuru, is spoken over the southern part of Rendova Island,  located in the Western Province of the Solomon Islands.

Classification
Touo is generally seen to be a member of the tentative Central Solomons family, although Glottolog considers it an isolate. Pedrós (2015) cautiously suggests Lavukaleve as the closest relative to Touo.  Most of the surrounding languages to Touo belong to the Oceanic subgroup of the Austronesian language family.

Names
The Touo language is sometimes called the Baniata (Mbaniata) or Lokuru language, after the largest two villages where the language is spoken. The word Touo comes from the ethnonym that Touo speakers use to refer to themselves.

Phonology

Consonants
Touo consonants are:

{| class="wikitable" style="text-align:center;"
|-
! colspan="2" | 
! labial
! alveolar
! velar
! glottal
|-
! colspan="2" | nasal
| 
| 
| 
| 
|-
! rowspan="2" | stop
! 
|
| 
|
| 
|-
! 
| 
| 
|  
| 
|-
! rowspan="2" | fricative
! 
| 
| 
| 
| 
|-
! 
| 
| 
| 
| 
|-
! colspan="2" | approximant
| 
| 
|  
| 
|-
! colspan="2" | liquid
| 
| 
| 
| 
|}

Vowels
Touo vowels have phonemically contrastive tense/lax vowels. Some minimal pairs showing the tense/lax vowel phonemic distinction in Touo:

{| 
| e || road || ḛ || oven
|-
| avo || garden || a̰vo || four
|-
| ua || who? || ṵa || eat
|-
| isi || small || ḭsi || sleep 
|}

Grammar
Word order in Touo is SOV.

Touo has four genders.
masculine
feminine
neuter I (generic)
neuter II (certain trees)

Only in certain paradigms of the singular number can neuter I and II be distinguished.

Touo distinguishes four numbers.
singular
dual
enumerated (i.e., numerically specified; can be used for both few or many numbers)
non-enumerated (i.e., not numerically specified; used for numbers greater than three)

See also
Tetepare language

Notes

 Paradisec has two collections of Arthur Cappell's materials (AC1, AC2) that include Touo language materials.

References

Languages of the Solomon Islands
Western Province (Solomon Islands)
Central Solomon languages